The Tree is a 1969 American film that was written, produced, and directed, by Robert Guenette. A psychological drama revolving around the kidnapping of a young child, the film stars Jordan Christopher, Eileen Heckart, Alan Landers, Gale Dixon, James Broderick, Kathy Ryan, Ruth Ford, and George Rose.

See also
 List of American films of 1969

References

External links
 

1969 films
1960s psychological drama films
American psychological drama films
Films about child abduction in the United States
Films directed by Robert Guenette
Films scored by Kenyon Hopkins
1969 drama films
1960s English-language films
1960s American films